The Hoff Building is an historic building in the western United States, located in Boise, Idaho. Designed by Boise architects Tourtellotte & Hummel, it was constructed  in 1930 in the style of Art Deco. Known as Hotel Boise until 1976, the building is a contributing resource in the Boise Capitol Area District, listed on the National Register of Historic Places since May 12, 1976.

At eleven floors in 1930, the building is considered Boise's first skyscraper and is the eleventh-tallest building in the city.

History
Hotel Boise was constructed in 1930 for Boise developer Walter E. Pierce on the former site of a Methodist church. The building included 400 hotel rooms and ten apartments; the commercial tenants included Leah's Corner Cupboard giftshop, Veda Renfro's Artistic Beauty Salon, Lee McClelland's Barber Shop, the North American Automobile Association, and the Hotel Boise Cab Company. The first hotel manager was Earl McInnis, and the hotel was an early affiliate of the Western Hotels Company.

Hotel Boise operated from 1930 until 1976, when it was sold to Hoff Companies, Inc. The new owner changed the name to Hoff Building, renovated the building for office space, added two floors, and removed Art Deco features. Two years later the building was sold to EBCO Inc., and the Art Deco details were reinstalled.

See also
 List of tallest buildings in Boise
 Downtown Boise

References

External links
 
 Hoff Building, Idaho Architecture Project

Skyscraper office buildings in Boise, Idaho
Hotels in Idaho
Office buildings completed in 1976
Commercial buildings on the National Register of Historic Places in Idaho
Historic district contributing properties in Idaho
Art Deco architecture in Idaho
1976 establishments in Idaho